Mehring is a municipality in Bavaria.

Mehring may also refer to:

People
Franz Mehring (1846–1919), German politician
Howard Mehring (1931–1978), American painter
Sona Mehring (1961–), American entrepreneur
Walter Mehring (1896–1981), German author

Places
Mehring, Rhineland-Palatinate, a municipality in Rhineland-Palatinate